Stephen Young may refer to:
 Stephen M. Young (1889–1984), Democratic United States Senator
 Stephen Young (actor) (born 1939), Canadian actor
 Sir Stephen Young, 3rd Baronet (born 1947), Scottish official who headed the Fatal Accident Inquiry into the 1994 Chinook crash on Mull of Kintyre
 Stephen M. Young (diplomat) (born 1951), Consul General of the United States of America in Hong Kong
 Stephen Scott Young (born 1957), American artist
 Stephen Young (businessman) (born 1955), British businessman, CEO of Meggitt
 Stephen Young (racing driver) (born 1969), American professional stock car racing driver
 Stephen G. Young (born 1952), American physician-scientist

See also
Steve Young (disambiguation)